Pierre Lamalattie (born 1956 in Paris) is a French painter, novelist and art critic. He lives and works in Paris.

Early life 

Although he learnt painting with grandmother Marguerite Juille and the artist Léo Lotz, he studied science. In 1975, he entered the Institut national agronomique Paris Grignon. He painted there regularly and created with some friends the review Karamazov in 1977. He graduated in 1980 with two specialities: political economy and ecology.

Career 

After one year in Algeria as a teacher, he began an engineering career at the Ministry of Agriculture, where he was in charge of an economic review. He became a mediator in industrial restructuring before teaching human resources and social issues at the Institut National Agronomique Paris-Grignon and at the Mines ParisTech.

In 1995, he began moving from engineering to painting and began to exhibit one year later. He focused on daily life of contemporaneous men and women (vicissitudes of sexuality, couples in crisis) and particularly, life at work. He is interested in the world of executives and in the weight of managerial speeches. In 2008, he began a series of imaginary portraits, dubbed “curriculum vitae”, mixing painting and inscriptions gthat point out a singularity or sum up a life in a few words.

He wrote his first novel in 2011, 121 curriculum vitae pour un tombeau, winning a prize at the Festival of The First Novel in Laval, and two years later, Précipitation en milieu acide. His literary texts are a continuation of his reflections about alienation at work.

Lamalattie contributes to magazines (Artension, Causeur, Écritique, etc.). His articles deal with periods of art history such as Caravaggisti and Academic art and art criticism.

Solo exhibitions (selection) 
 1996: Galerie Sylvie Guimiot, Paris
 1997: Galerie Elian Lizart, Brussxels
 1999: Galerie de Passy, Paris
 2003: Centre culturel St-Honoré, Paris
 2004: Siège de la Société Générale, Paris
 2006: Galerie Serpentine, Paris
 2007: Galerie Jamault, Paris. Galerie Art actuel, Paris
 2008: Socles et cimaises, Nancy
 2009: Chapelle Saint-Libéral, Brive
 2011: Peindre des vies toutes entières, galerie Alain Blondel, Paris
 2014: Galerie Alain Blondel, Paris

Collective exhibitions 

 1997, 1998: May Salon, Paris

 2005, 2008 and 2009: Nude Art, Paris

 2007, 2008 and 2009: MAC 2000, Paris

 2009 : Artscènes / Galerie FHM, Boulogne

 2010: Copart, Révigny-sur-Ornain

 2016 : « Still life – Style of life », Jean-Marie Oger, Paris

See also

Bibliography 
 121 curriculum vitae peints par Pierre Lamalattie, preface by Françoise Monnin, Martin Media, 2010.
 Portraits, L'Éditeur, 2011

Novels 
 121 curriculum vitae pour un tombeau, L’éditeur, Paris, 2011.
 Précipitation en milieu acide, L’éditeur, Paris, 2013.

External links

References

French contemporary painters
20th-century French painters
20th-century French male artists
French male painters
21st-century French painters
21st-century French male artists
1956 births
Living people
20th-century French novelists
21st-century French novelists
French male novelists
20th-century French male writers
21st-century French male writers
Academic staff of Mines Paris - PSL